Events from the year 1643 in Ireland.

Incumbent
Monarch: Charles I

Events
March 18 – Irish Confederate Wars: Battle of New Ross: James Butler, Earl of Ormonde, defeats Thomas Preston and a numerically superior Irish Confederate army north of the town of New Ross.
June 4 – Confederate Wars: Battle of Funcheon Ford: Catholic Confederation commander James Tuchet, 3rd Earl of Castlehaven's horsemen surprise and rout hundreds of Baron Inchiquin's men near Castlelyons in County Cork.
September – Confederate Wars: "Cessation" (i.e. ceasefire) arranged by Ormond places the greater part of Ireland into the hands of the Catholic Confederation.
An Calbhach mac Aedh Ó Conchobhair Donn, The Ó Conchubhair Donn, Chief of the Name of the Clan Ó Conchubhair, is popularly inaugurated as King.

Births

Deaths
September 15 – Richard Boyle, 1st Earl of Cork, Lord High Treasurer of Ireland (b. 1566)
Mícheál Ó Cléirigh, chronicler and chief author of the Annals of the Four Masters (b. c. 1590)

References

 
1640s in Ireland
Ireland
Years of the 17th century in Ireland